Synechodes platysema is a moth in the family Brachodidae. It was described by Edward Meyrick in 1921. It is found on Java in Indonesia.

The wingspan is about 18 mm. The forewings are dark with a pale yellow costal margin and a yellow spot near the base, as well as a pale yellow, moon-shaped spot. The hindwings are yellow, but black at the base. There is a black marginal band.

References

Brachodidae
Moths described in 1921